Iftikhar Khan Jhagra (died 2017) was a Pakistani politician and former provincial minister who served as a member of the Khyber Pakhtunkhwa Assembly.

References

Year of birth missing
2017 deaths
Pakistan People's Party politicians
Members of the Provincial Assembly of Khyber Pakhtunkhwa